Joseph Andreas Buchner (28 November 1776, in Altheim – 13 December 1854, in Munich) was a German historian. He was the author of a highly regarded multi-volume work on Bavarian history.

He studied theology at the Georgianum in Munich, and was ordained as a priest in 1799. From 1804 he taught classes in philosophy at the lyceum in Dillingen, then in 1811 relocated as a professor of history to the lyceum in Regensburg. In 1825 he became a member of the Bavarian Academy of Sciences, and during the following year, was named a professor of Bavarian history at the University of Munich.

Selected works 
 Geschichte von Baiern (10 volumes 1820–55) – History of Bavaria.
 Lehrbuch der allgemeinen Geschichte (1826) – Textbook of general history.
 Neue Beiträge zur vaterländischen Geschichte, Geographie und Statistik : eine Fortsetzung der Westenrieder'schen Beiträge über dieselben Gegenstände (with Lorenz Zierl, 1832) – New contributions to national history, geography and statistics: a continuation of Lorenz von  Westenrieder's contributions on the same subjects. 
 Ueber die Einwohner Deutschlands im zweyten Jahrhundert der christlichen Zeitrechnung (1838) – On the inhabitants of Germany in the second century of the Christian chronology.
 Krieg des Herzogs Ludwig des Reichen mit Markgraf Albrecht Achilles von Brandenburg vom Jahr 1458-1462 (1842) – War of Louis IX, Duke of Bavaria with Margrave Albrecht Achilles of Brandenburg from the year 1458 to 1462.
 Landtafel der vier Rentämter des Fürstenthums Bayern zu Anfang der Regierung des Herzogs Maximilian I (1848) – Landtafel of the four  of the principality of Bavaria at the beginning of the reign of Duke Maximilian I.
 Der letzte Landtag der altbayerischen Landstände im Jahre 1669 (1851) – The last Landtag of the old Bavarian provinces in 1669.

References 

1776 births
1854 deaths
People from Landshut (district)
Academic staff of the Ludwig Maximilian University of Munich
19th-century German historians